In Greek mythology, Anchurus was a Phrygian prince as the son of Midas—the heavily mythologized but still historical king of Phrygia—in whose reign the earth opened in the area of the town of Celaenae in Phyrgia.

Mythology 
Midas consulted the oracle about how the opening might be closed and he was commanded to throw into it the most precious thing he possessed. He accordingly threw into it a great quantity of gold and silver, but when the chasm still did not close, his son Anchurus, thinking that life was the most precious of all things, mounted his horse and leapt into the chasm, which closed immediately.

Note

Reference 

 Lucius Mestrius Plutarchus, Moralia with an English Translation by Frank Cole Babbitt. Cambridge, MA. Harvard University Press. London. William Heinemann Ltd. 1936. Online version at the Perseus Digital Library. Greek text available from the same website.

Princes in Greek mythology
Mythology of Macedonia (region)
Supernatural legends
Fiction about suicide